Obsesión is the 1990 debut solo album of Argentine singer Miguel Mateos. Although Mateos had effectively been a solo act since, Zas, the band he founded began to call itself Miguel Mateos – Zas in 1993. All the songs on the album were written by Mateos.

Track listing
"Obsesión" (4:05)
"Tirar los muros abajo" (3:40)
"Desnúdame" (5:09)
"Voy a juntar mis pedazos" (3:55)
"Si te gusta" (2:56) (bonus track)
"Malos pensamientos" (5:55)
"El diablo en tu corazón" (4:04)
"Es por tu amor" (4:02)
"Ciudades en coma" (4:03)
"Estoy ciego" (3:48)
"Lágrimas bajo la lluvia" (5:44)

References

1990 albums